Ivo Karlović was the defending champion but decided not to participate.
Jack Sock won the final against Mischa Zverev 6–1, 1–6, 7–6(7–3).

Seeds

Draw

Finals

Top half

Bottom half

References
 Main draw
 Qualifying draw

2012 ATP Challenger Tour
2012 Singles